The 1972 Tulsa Golden Hurricane football team represented the University of Tulsa as a member of the Missouri Valley Conference (MVC) during the 1972 NCAA University Division football season. The Golden Hurricane compiled an overall record of 4–7 record with a mark of 3–2 in conference play, tying for fourth place in the MVC. The team began the season in its third year under Claude "Hoot" Gibson and went 1–5 in games under Gibson. After six games, Gibson was fired and replaced by F. A. Dry, who led the team to a record of 3–2 over the final five games of the season.

The team's statistical leaders included Todd Starks with 1,201 passing yards, Ed White with 675 rushing yards, and Drew Pearson with 690 receiving yards.

Schedule

Notes

References

Tulsa
Tulsa Golden Hurricane football seasons
Tulsa Golden Hurricane football